Leslie Allman (26 May 1902 – 21 March 1979) was a footballer. Allman, a goalkeeper spent the majority of his career in non-league football, but made 15 professional appearances for Norwich City from 1926 to 1928.

Sources

1902 births
1979 deaths
Norwich City F.C. players
English footballers
Association football goalkeepers